Alanyl—tRNA synthetase, mitochondrial, also known as alanine—tRNA ligase (AlaRS) or alanyl—tRNA synthetase 2 (AARS2), is an enzyme that in humans is encoded by the AARS2 gene.

Clinical relevance
Mutations in the AARS2 gene result in infantile mitochondrial cardiomyopathies. Progressive leukoencephalopathy with Ovarian Failure (LKENP).

References

Further reading

External links 
  
 
 CureARS non profit organisation supporting families affected by ARS mutations, including AARS2.

EC 6.1.1